Matías Quiroga may refer to:

 Matías Alejandro Quiroga (born April 1986), football centre forward for Club Atlético Patronato
 Matías Leonel Quiroga (born January 1986), football midfielder for Sarmiento de Resistencia